The La Magascona and Magasquila photovoltaic power stations ( and ) is a complex of photovoltaic power stations at La Magascona, Trujillo, in Cáceres, Spain. The power station produces approximately 46 GWh of electricity per year. It was commissioned in July 2007.

It was commissioned in June 2008.

References

Photovoltaic power stations in Spain
Energy in Extremadura